Carnegie Building may refer to:

Carnegie Building (Atlanta)
Carnegie Building (Troy, New York)
Carnegie Building (Pittsburgh)

See also
Lists of Carnegie libraries